Stuart James Wardley (born 10 September 1975, in Cambridge) is an English former professional football midfielder.

Biography
Wardley played for non-league Saffron Walden Town, Bishops Stortford and Saffron Walden again, while working as removals, before joining Queens Park Rangers in July 1999 for a fee of £15,000. His debut came on 7 August 1999 when he was a late substitute, for Jermaine Darlington in Rangers' 3–1 win at home to Huddersfield Town.

In January 2002, Wardley joined Rushden & Diamonds on loan, signing on a free transfer in April 2002. He missed most of the 2003–04 season due to a serious knee injury. He played pre-season for Bishop Stortford and in August 2004 joined Torquay United on a one-month contract. He signed a three-month contract extension in September 2004, but left in October 2004 to join Leyton Orient. He moved to Cambridge United on non-contract terms in January 2005, playing just three times before being released after a month. He had a trial with Rushden in February 2005, but was not offered a contract.

He played for Saffron Walden Town before signing for Bedford Town in March 2005. He left Bedford at the end of the season.

In 2008, he was appointed as joint-manager of Bishops Stortford Swifts.

In September 2008, he was playing for Debden, and from the start of the 2009 season he has played for Haverhill Rovers, scoring on his debut for the club in a 1–1 draw with Dereham Town. In 2012, he re-signed for Saffron Walden as a player-coach. He was appointed joint manager of the club alongside Colin Wallington in 2013, and became sole manager of the club in 2014. In September 2018 he left the club.

On 6 February 2019, Wardley was announced as the new manager of Haverhill Rovers. However, he resigned from the role in May.

References

External links

Living people
1974 births
Sportspeople from Cambridge
English footballers
Saffron Walden Town F.C. players
Bishop's Stortford F.C. players
Queens Park Rangers F.C. players
Rushden & Diamonds F.C. players
Torquay United F.C. players
Leyton Orient F.C. players
Cambridge United F.C. players
Bedford Town F.C. players
Haverhill Rovers F.C. players
English football managers
Saffron Walden Town F.C. managers
Haverhill Rovers F.C. managers
Association football midfielders
Essex Senior Football League players
Association football coaches